Marcello Crescenzi (died 13 August 1630) was a Roman Catholic prelate who served as Bishop of Assisi (1591–1630).

Biography
On 13 November 1591, Marcello Crescenzi was appointed during the papacy of Pope Innocent IX as Bishop of Assisi.
On 4 December 1591, he was consecrated bishop by Michele Bonelli, Cardinal-Bishop of Albano, with Paolo Alberi, Archbishop Emeritus of Dubrovnik, and Rutilio Benzoni, Bishop of Loreto, with serving as co-consecrators. 
He served as Bishop of Assisi until his death on 13 August 1630.

Episcopal succession
While bishop, he was the principal consecrator of:
Domenico de' Marini (patriarch), Bishop of Albenga (1611);
Francesco Boncompagni, Bishop of Fano (1623); 
and the principal co-consecrator of:
Dionisio Martini, Bishop of Nepi e Sutri (1616).

References

External links and additional sources
 (for Chronology of Bishops)
 (for Chronology of Bishops)

16th-century Italian Roman Catholic bishops
17th-century Italian Roman Catholic bishops
Bishops appointed by Pope Innocent IX
1630 deaths
Year of birth unknown